Colubrina oppositifolia, known as kauila in Hawaiian, is a rare species of flowering tree in the family Rhamnaceae endemic to Hawaii.

Description
The trunk is coated in shredding gray-brown bark and the smaller twigs are reddish. The leaves are oppositely arranged and have pointed oval blades. The yellow-green flowers occur in clusters of 10 to 12. The fruit is a rounded capsule which is explosively dehiscent.

Distribution and habitat
There is also one individual remaining on Maui. Associated plants include alahee (Psydrax odorata) and ohe kukuluāeo (Reynoldsia sandwicensis).

Uses
Native Hawaiians valued the hard wood of C. oppositifolia and that of a related species, Alphitonia ponderosa, both of which were known as kauila.  Consequently, the exact usage of C. oppositifolia wood is unknown.  It is believed to have been used in pou (house posts), hohoa (round kapa beaters), ie kūkū (square kapa beaters), ō (harpoons), hia kā upena (fishing net shuttles), ihe pahee (javelins), pololū (spears), pāhoa (daggers), lāa pālau (clubs), leiomano (shark tooth clubs), ōō (digging sticks), pieces for ume (a wand game), and ūkēkē (musical bows).

Conservation
This tree has become very rare in the wild. Once a dominant species of the forests it inhabits, it has now been reduced to no more than 300 wild individuals. Threats to the species have included introduced plant species, herbivory by feral pigs and goats, rats, and the black twig borer (Xylosandrus compactus), an invasive insect. The hard wood made it valuable to people, who overharvested it. This is a federally listed endangered species of the United States.

See also
 Alphitonia ponderosa
 Kauila

References

External links

oppositifolia
Endemic flora of Hawaii
Biota of Hawaii (island)
Trees of Hawaii
Biota of Oahu
Plants described in 1867
Taxa named by Adolphe-Théodore Brongniart
Taxa named by Horace Mann Jr.